Blues for Willadean is a 2012 American drama film written and directed by Del Shores and starring Beth Grant and Octavia Spencer.  It is based on Shores’ 2003 play The Trials and Tribulations of a Trailer Trash Housewife.

Plot
The story is about Willadean, a woman who explores the shame, emotions and privacy of battered women. A film mixed with drama, humor, pain but which offers just hope to abused women. Willadean, wife of a truck driver, tries to escape from the small prison she built thanks to a friend and friend LaSonia who is always close to her and is a blues singer and encourages her with music.

Cast
Beth Grant as Willadean Winkler
Octavia Spencer as LaSonia Robinson
Dale Dickey as Rayleen Hobbs
David Steen as J.D. Winkler
Debby Holiday as Blues Singer
Louise Beard as Mrs. Garrison

Production
The film was shot in Atlanta.

References

External links
 
 

2012 films
American drama films
Films shot in Atlanta
Films shot in Georgia (U.S. state)
American films based on plays
2012 drama films
2010s English-language films
2010s American films